Percy Fairclough (1 February 1858 – 22 June 1947) was an English amateur footballer who made one appearance for England in 1878.

Football career
Fairclough was born in Mile End, east London and was educated at Forest School, Walthamstow, where he played for the school football team.

After leaving school, he joined the Old Foresters. In 1878, shortly after his twentieth birthday, he was selected by England for the match at Hampden Park, Glasgow against Scotland on 2 March. Although England "fielded a side they thought capable of defeating the Scots, ...(they) returned home with a humiliating 7-2 defeat", with three of the Scottish goals coming from John McDougall. Fairclough was described as a "powerful if somewhat ungainly forward".

He subsequently joined the Corinthian club, although he does not appear to have actually played for them.

Life outside football
He was killed on 22 June 1947 in a road accident at the age of 89.

References

External links
England profile on www.englandstats.com
England profile on www.englandfc.com
Career details on www.englandfootballonline.com

1858 births
Footballers from Mile End
1947 deaths
People educated at Forest School, Walthamstow
English footballers
England international footballers
Corinthian F.C. players
Road incident deaths in England
Old Foresters F.C. players
Association football forwards